4-Aminobenzoic acid (also known as para-aminobenzoic acid or PABA because the two functional groups are attached to the benzene ring across from one another in the para position) is an organic compound with the formula H2NC6H4CO2H.  PABA is a white solid, although commercial samples can appear gray.  It is slightly soluble in water.  It consists of a benzene ring substituted with amino and carboxyl groups.  The compound occurs extensively in the natural world.

Production and occurrence
In industry, PABA is prepared mainly by two routes:
 Reduction of 4-nitrobenzoic acid 
 Hoffman degradation of the monoamide derived from terephthalic acid.

Food sources of PABA include liver, brewer's yeast (and unfiltered beer), kidney, molasses, mushrooms, and whole grains.

Biology

Biochemistry

PABA is an intermediate in the synthesis of folate by bacteria, plants, and fungi.
Many bacteria, including those found in the human intestinal tract such as E. coli, generate PABA from chorismate by the combined action of the enzymes 4-amino-4-deoxychorismate synthase and 4-amino-4-deoxychorismate lyase. Plants produce PABA in their chloroplasts, and store it as a glucose ester (pABA-Glc) in their tissues. Humans lack the enzymes to convert PABA to folate and so require folate from dietary sources, such as green leafy vegetables. In humans, PABA is considered nonessential and, although it has been referred to historically as "vitamin Bx", is no longer recognized as a vitamin because the typical human gut microbiome generates PABA on its own.

Sulfonamide drugs are structurally similar to PABA, and their antibacterial activity is due to their ability to interfere with the conversion of PABA to folate by the enzyme dihydropteroate synthetase.  Thus, bacterial growth is limited through folate deficiency.

Medical use
The potassium salt is used as a drug against fibrotic skin disorders, such as Peyronie's disease, under the brand name Potaba. PABA is also occasionally used in pill form by sufferers of irritable bowel syndrome to treat its associated gastrointestinal symptoms, and in nutritional epidemiological studies to assess the completeness of 24-hour urine collection for the determination of urinary sodium, potassium, or nitrogen levels.

Nutritional supplement
Despite the lack of any recognized syndromes of PABA deficiency in humans, except for those who lack the colonic bacteria that generate PABA, many claims of benefit are made by commercial suppliers of PABA as a nutritional supplement.  The benefit is claimed for fatigue, irritability, depression, weeping eczema (moist eczema), scleroderma (premature hardening of the skin), patchy pigment loss in the skin (vitiligo), and premature grey hair.

Commercial and industrial use
PABA finds use in the biomedical sector. Its derivatives are found as a structural component in 1.5% of  a database of 12111 commercial drugs. Other uses include its conversion to specialty azo dyes and crosslinking agents.  PABA is also used as a biodegradable pesticide, though its use is now limited due to evolution of new variants of bio-pesticides.

In the past, PABA was widely used in sunscreens as a UV filter. It is a UVB absorber, meaning it can absorb wavelengths between 290 and 320 nm. while still allowing UVA wavelengths between 320-400 nm to pass through, producing a tan.
Patented in 1943, PABA was one of the first active ingredients to be used in sunscreen. The first in vivo studies on mice showed that PABA reduced UV damage. In addition, it was shown to protect against skin tumors in rodents.
Animal and in vitro studies in the early 1980s suggested PABA might increase the risk of cellular UV damage. On the basis of these studies, as well as problems with allergies and clothing discoloration, PABA fell out of favor as a sunscreen.  However, water-insoluble PABA derivatives such as padimate O are currently used in some cosmetic products including mascara, concealer, and matte lipsticks. 

As of 2008, the advancement of new sunscreen is focused on developing a broad spectrum of active ingredients that provide consistent protection across all wavelengths, including UVA. Researchers are considering the PABA–TiO2 Hybrid Nanostructures that result from the method of aqueous in situ synthesis with PABA and TiO2.

Safety considerations
PABA is largely nontoxic; the median lethal dose of PABA in dogs (oral) is 2 g/kg. Allergic reactions to PABA can occur. It is formed in the metabolism of certain ester local anesthetics, and many allergic reactions to local anesthetics are the result of reactions to PABA.

References

External links
 
 

Anilines
Benzoic acids
IARC Group 3 carcinogens
Sunscreening agents
Non-proteinogenic amino acids